The members of the 29th General Assembly of Newfoundland were elected in the Newfoundland general election held in June 1949. The general assembly sat from July 11, 1949 to November 3, 1951. This was the first general election held in Newfoundland since the assembly was replaced by an appointed Commission of Government in 1934. Newfoundland had joined Canadian confederation in March 1949.

The Liberal Party led by Joey Smallwood formed the government.

Reginald F. Sparkes served as speaker.

There were four sessions of the 29th General Assembly:

Sir Albert Walsh served as lieutenant governor of Newfoundland until September 1949. Sir Leonard Outerbridge succeeded Walsh as lieutenant governor.

Members of the Assembly 
The following members were elected to the assembly in 1949:

Notes:

By-elections 
None

References 

Terms of the General Assembly of Newfoundland and Labrador